Randy Holden  (born July 2, 1945)  is an American guitarist best known for his involvement with the West Coast acid rock group Blue Cheer on their third album, New! Improved! (1969).  Additionally, he is a painter. His album Population II from 1970 is considered to be one of the earliest examples of doom metal.

Biography
Randy Holden was born in Pennsylvania and grew up on the move. He played in a number of bands including the Iridescents (blues rock), the Fender IV (surf rock) and the Sons of Adam (surf rock/psychedelic rock). Holden relocated the Fender IV from Baltimore, Maryland, to Southern California and they eventually became The Sons of Adam. While playing in the Sons of Adam Holden opened for the Rolling Stones at their first show at the Long Beach Sports Arena. Holden was heavily influenced by Keith Richards' guitar and amp set up which helped change his own attitude towards equipment and tone. The Sons of Adam (specifically Holden) began experimenting with distortion and feedback which pushed into psychedelic rock. Holden left the band frustrated with the lack of original material.

Holden joined the Other Half, a psychedelic garage band from Los Angeles. In 1968, they recorded an album, but Holden soon left and replaced Leigh Stephens in Blue Cheer. He toured with them for a year and contributed three songs for the album New! Improved! Blue Cheer (1969). He is credited with the songwriting, vocal, and guitars for "Peace of Mind", "Fruits & Icebergs", and "Honey Butter Love". However, he left the group during the recording sessions and the rest of the album was recorded with other musicians.

Frustrated with lack of control over the bands, Randy formed his next new band with drummer Chris Lockheed. Lockheed, also a keyboard player, uniquely played both drums and keyboard simultaneously in live performances. During this time Holden obtained a sponsorship deal with Sunn amplifiers. Through this, he received his famous sixteen 200 Watt amplifiers. His new band was dubbed "Randy Holden - Population II" which was a reference to the fact there were only two members in the band as well as being an astronomical term "Population II" that defines a special kind of Star Group cluster type, having Heavy Metal in its composition.  An appropriate description of the original style of the music attributed to Holden's new band.  The band recorded its only album, Population II (1970). Trouble with the release of the album led to Holden going bankrupt, losing all his equipment and his departure from music for over two decades. Population II was eventually released multiple times in bootleg forms over the years, with no official re-release until a limited issue in LP in 2005 and finally a remastered CD in 2008.  The album has become a much-sought-after collectors' item over the years.

After more than two decades he returned to his guitar, and began creating music again, reportedly at the continual urging of a loyal fan. He recorded Guitar God in 1994 and released Guitar God 2001 in 2001, followed in 2008 with the release of Raptor.

In 2008 Richie Unterberger said "He's a good candidate for selection as the great unknown 1960s rock guitar hero.  No other American guitarist was as skilled at creating the kind of sustain-heavy, snaky guitar lines pioneered by Jeff Beck in the Yardbirds. His recordings with the Fender IV, The Sons of Adam, Ugly Things, The Other Half, and Blue Cheer, as well as his solo recordings, don't only contain some feverishly innovative playing, they also chart the overall rainbow of changes undergone by California 1960s rock guitar as a whole, from surf to pseudo-Merseybeat to psychedelia, hard rock and heavy metal."

In 2010, Holden began working with Randy Pratt (Cactus) and drummer Bobby Rondinelli (Black Sabbath, Rainbow, Blue Oyster Cult) on Population III, released by Ridingeasy Records on July 1, 2022. Pratt and Holden both composed the songs on Population III.<ref> "Population III." Ridingeasy Records, "nofollow">https://randyholden.bandcamp.com/</a>. Liner notes. July 1, 2022. Retrieved September 18, 2022.</ref>

Personal life
Randy is married to American artist Ruth Mayer.  His son, Marlon Holden, is a photographer.

Discography

The Fender IV
Mar Gaya / You Better Tell Me Now (1964)
Malibu Run / Everybody Up (1965)
Fender IV: Surf 101 - Live (2016) (DVD)

The Sons of Adam
Take My Hand / Tomorrow's Gonna Be Another Day (1965)
You're A Better Man Than I / Saturday's Son (1966)
Without Love
I Told You Once Before
You Make Me Feel Good

The Other Half
The Other Half (1968)

Blue Cheer
New! Improved! (1969)

Lucifer
Unreleased album (1969–1970)

Touch of Heaven (collaborative project with opera singer Jaclyn Guthrie)Visions of You (2010)

SoloPopulation II (1970)Guitar God (1997)Guitar God 2001 (2001)Surf Guitar God 1963/2001 (2007) (Fender IV compilation plus new music)Raptor (2007)Psychedelic Blue (2011) (largely a covers album with some new material)Population III'' (2022)

References

External links
 Randy Holden Interview - NAMM Oral History Library (2016)

1945 births
Living people
Musicians from Pennsylvania
American rock guitarists
American male guitarists
Blue Cheer members
20th-century American guitarists
Artists from Pennsylvania
Songwriters from Pennsylvania
20th-century American male musicians
American male songwriters